The Brighton Districts and Old Scholars Football Club Inc., nicknamed the Bombers, is an Australian rules football club based in the southern suburbs of Adelaide which was formed in 1991 as a merger between the former Brighton Football Club and Brighton High Old Scholars Football Club.  Also known as the Brighton Bombers, BDOS competed in the South Australian Amateur Football League (SAAFL).  In 1994, BDOS joined the Southern Football League in the junior grades, and were followed by the senior teams from the SAAFL in 1997.  In 2017, BDOS shifted to the Adelaide Footy League.

Brighton Districts has produced a number of Australian Football League (AFL) players including Jarrad Sundqvist (Sydney Swans), Matthew Bode (Adelaide), Kane Cornes (Port Adelaide), Ben Kennedy (Collingwood/Melbourne) Bailey Williams (Western Bulldogs) and Cory Gregson (Geelong).

A-Grade Premierships

 Adelaide Footy League/SAAFL Division 3 (2)
 1991 
 2017
 Southern Football League A-Grade (2)
 2002
 2011

Merger history 
Brighton Districts and Old Scholars was formed in 1991 through the amalgamation of Brighton and Brighton High Old Scholars.

Brighton (1938–1990) 
also Brighton and Seacliff
The Brighton and Seacliff Football Club was formed in 1938 through the amalgamation of the Brighton and Seacliff clubs.  Playing in the Glenelg District Football Association, Brighton and Seacliff formed a brief merger with Sturt for four years during World War II, before resuming as a separate entity in 1946.  Brighton and Seacliff was renamed back to just Brighton in 1957 and in 1958 transferred to the South Australian Amateur Football League A3 competition, gaining consecutive promotions to the A1 division over the first two seasons.  Brighton remained in A1 until they finished last in 1965, played the next three seasons in A2 before shifting back to the now Glenelg-South Adelaide Football Association in 1969.  Brighton remained in the Glenelg-South Adelaide FA until its demise at the end of 1986, by then known as the Southern Metropolitan Football League, when they shifted to the South Australian Football Association (SAFA).  Brighton competed in the SAFA competition until the end of the 1990 season, when they merged with Brighton High Old Scholars.

A-Grade Premierships
 Glenelg-South-West District Football Association A1 (1)
 1957
 Glenelg-South Adelaide Football Association A1 (4)
 1970
 1978
 1982
 1983
 Southern Metropolitan Football League A1 (1)
 1986
 SAAFL A2 (1)
 1959 
 SAAFL A3 (1)
 1958

Brighton (1885–1937) 
The Brighton Football Club was formed in 1885 playing at 'Turner's Paddock'. In 1912, they were inaugural members of the Sturt Football Association.  Brighton continued in that competition as it changed names to Mid-Southern FA and then Glenelg District FA. In 1938 Brighton amalgamated with the Seacliff Football Club to form the Brighton and Seacliff Football Club.

A-Grade Premierships
 Mid-Southern Football Association A-Grade (4)
 1920
 1923  
 1924 
 1925 
 Glenelg District Football Association A-Grade (1)
 1936

Seacliff 
The Seacliff Football Club was formed in 1931 and joined the Glenelg District Football Association. Seacliff competed for five seasons, finishing minor premiers in 1935, until going into recess in 1936.  In 1938 Seacliff partnered with Brighton to form the Brighton and Seacliff Football Club.

Sturt-Brighton 
For four seasons during World War II (1942–1945), Brighton and Seacliff combined with Sturt (now Marion) to form Sturt-Brighton.  In 1946 both clubs reformed in their own right.

A-Grade Premierships
 Glenelg District Football Association A-Grade (1)
 1944
 1945

Brighton High Old Scholars 
The Brighton High Old Scholars Football Club (BHOS) was formed in 1968 by a group of ex-Students of Brighton High School and entered the South Australian Amateur Football League A6 competition.  Following winning the A6 premiership in 1969, they were promoted to A5 and repeated the premiership win to make their way into A4.  BHOS made it three-in-a-row in 1971, winning the A4 premiership and securing their place in A3.  BHOS remained in A3 for six seasons before securing promotion through a Grand Final loss to Old Ignatians in 1976.  BHOS only lasted for three seasons in A2 before being relegated to A3 for the 1980 season. 1981 saw an A3 wooden spoon and relegation to A4, followed by the wooden spoon in the A4 competition in 1982 to land in A5. An A5 Grand Final loss in 1985 to Salisbury College resulted in promotion to A4 and was directly followed by the A4 premiership in 1986.  The following season, BHOS again secured promotion via a losing grand final, this time to Goodwood Saints.  BHOS merged with the Brighton Football Club at the end of the 1990 season, after they finished bottom of the A2 competition without winning a game.  The new club, named Brighton Districts and Old Scholars, continued in A3 in place of Brighton High Old Scholars.

A-Grade Premierships
 SAAFL A4 (2)
 1971 
 1986 
 SAAFL A5 (1)
 1970 
 SAAFL A6 (1)
 1969

Greatest SFL Team 
To celebrate the 125th anniversary of the Southern Football League, each club was asked to name their "Greatest Team" whilst participating in the SFL.

References

External links

 

 
 

Southern Football League (SA) Clubs
Australian rules football clubs in South Australia
1991 establishments in Australia
Australian rules football clubs established in 1991